Local elections in Benue State were held on 7 May 2022.

References

See also 

Benue State local elections
May 2022 events in Nigeria
2022 local elections in Nigeria